Benson Tower (formerly Dominion Tower and the CNG Tower), located at 1450 Poydras Street in the Central Business District of New Orleans, Louisiana, is a 26-story, -tall skyscraper. The building was purchased by late New Orleans Saints owner Tom Benson on September 15, 2009 and renamed the Benson Tower.  In 2012, Ochsner Health System moved executives and as many as 750 administrative employees to the top four floors  as well as the 2nd and 3rd floor space with balconies overlooking Champions Square and the Caesars Superdome; second floor space is utilized for Benson's television station, Fox affiliate WVUE (Channel 8) for the station's morning newscast, sporting events and by lease for other parties. According to Corporate Realty, which leases the  building, as of August 2012, Benson Tower is more than 97.6% leased.

Location
1450 Poydras StreetNew Orleans, LA

It is part of a complex of connected buildings which includes the Mercedes-Benz Superdome, 1250 Poydras Plaza, Entergy Tower, and the Hyatt Regency New Orleans.

See also
 List of tallest buildings in New Orleans

References

External links

 Benson Tower, Official Website
 Corporate Realty, Official Website

Skyscraper office buildings in New Orleans
Office buildings completed in 1989
HOK (firm) buildings